Forto (Tigrinya: ፎርቶ ሳዋ)is a town in Eritrea.  It is located in the Gash-Barka region and is the capital of Forto District.

References
Statoids.com, retrieved December 8, 2010

Populated places in Eritrea
Gash-Barka Region